The Massachusetts Charter School Athletic Organization is a league formed to give Charter School student athletes in Massachusetts, USA, the opportunity to compete in interscholastic sports. 

The mission of the Massachusetts Charter School Athletic Organization (MCSAO) is to oversee "the regulation, organization and promotion of its member schools interscholastic athletic programs. MCSAO provides opportunities for charter school student/athletes to compete at a high level and uses that competition to teach the fundamental values of teamwork, discipline, sacrifice and sportsmanship. This will contribute to the students' overall educational experience and development as individuals. MCSAO is committed to educating our youth for a better tomorrow and will work in partnership with local communities to establish and maintain charter school interscholastic athletic programs."

Current high school members:
 Academy Of The Pacific Rim
 Boston Collegiate Charter School
 Boston Preparatory Charter Public School
 City On A Hill Charter Public Schools
 City On A Hill Charter Public Schools II
 City On A Hill New Bedford
 Codman Academy Charter Public School
 Community Charter School Of Cambridge
 Edward Brooke
 Edward M. Kennedy
 Excel Academy High Sch
 Kipp Academy Lynn
 Match
 Neighborhood House Charter School
 Paulo Freire Social Justice Charter School
 Phoenix Charter Academy
 Phoenix Academy Lawrence
 Phoenix Springfield Charter Academy
 Pioneer Charter School Of Science
 Pioneer Charter School Of Science II
 Prospect Hill Academy Charter School
 Roxbury Preparatory Charter School
 Salem Academy Charter School
 South Shore Charter Public School

Current middle school members:
 Academy of the Pacific Rim
 Boston Prep
 Edward Brooke East Boston
 Edward Brooke Mattapan
 Edward Brooke Roslindale
 Community Charter School of Cambridge
 Codman
 Community Day
 Davis Leadership Academy
 Epiphany School
 Excel Academy Chelsea
 Excel Academy East Boston
 Excel Academy Orient Heights
 Foxboro Regional
 KIPP Academy Boston
 KIPP Academy Lynn
 MATCH
 Marblehead Community
 McAuliffe Regional
 Neighborhood House
 New Heights
 Pioneer School of Science I
 Prospect Hill Academy
 Roxbury Prep Dorchester
 Roxbury Prep Lucy Stone
 Roxbury Prep Mission Hill
 Salem Academy
 South Shore
 UP Academy Boston
 UP Academy Dorchester
 Community Day Gateway
 Community Day Webster

Charter School Athletic Organization
 
Charter School Athletic Organization
Massachusetts high school sports associations
High school sports associations in the United States